Vera Aleksandrovna Sokolova (born June 8, 1987 in Solianoy, Morgaushsky District, Chuvash Republic) is a Russian race walker.

A gold medalist on the track at World Youth and European Junior level, she won her first major senior medal at the 2010 European Athletics Championships, taking the 20 km road walk bronze medal. She also represented Russia at the 2009 World Championships in Athletics.

She won the 2011 Russian Winter Walking Championships in Sochi with a world record in the 20 km road walk of 1:25:08, knocking 33 seconds off the former record set by Olimpiada Ivanova in the 2005 World Championships final. She continues to be coached by Viktor Chegin, after he has been suspended for a lengthy series of performance-enhancing drug suspensions against many of his athletes.

Doping case
In September 2015 IAAF confirmed that Sokolova was provisionally suspended after a sample from an out-of-competition control in Saransk in June had been found positive for a prohibited substance.

Achievements

See also
List of doping cases in athletics

References

External links

1987 births
Living people
People from Chuvashia
Sportspeople from Chuvashia
Russian female racewalkers
Universiade gold medalists in athletics (track and field)
Universiade gold medalists for Russia
Medalists at the 2013 Summer Universiade
World Athletics Championships athletes for Russia
World Youth Championships in Athletics winners
European Athletics Championships medalists
Russian Athletics Championships winners
World record setters in athletics (track and field)
20th-century Russian women
21st-century Russian women